The Office of eDiplomacy is an applied technology think tank for the United States Department of State.  The Office of eDiplomacy is staffed by Foreign and Civil Service Officers, as well as contract professionals. There are four branches, the Diplomatic Innovation Division (DID), the Knowledge Leadership Division (KLD), the Customer Liaison Division (CLD), and the Business Requirements Unit (BRU). 

The unit was formed in response to recommendations from the 1999 Overseas Presence Advisory Panel that the State Department improve its ability to communicate and share knowledge.

eDiplomacy's Customer Liaison Division facilitates and enhances communications between the Bureau of Information Resource Management and its domestic users. With a mandated goal of providing customer satisfaction with products, platforms and services developed by the IRM Bureau. In addition, the CLD collaborates with other U.S. Government agencies and multiple other entities to provide information services that advance U.S. security, emergency preparedness, and communications objectives.

History
In 2002, Ambassador James Holmes started the eDiplomacy Task Force. In 2003, the task force was reorganized into the Office of eDiplomacy. Currently, eDiplomacy falls under the Deputy Chief Information Officer for Business, Management, and Planning.

David L. McCormick is the current Director, Tristram Perry is the Chief of eDiplomacy's Knowledge Leadership Division, Veronica Branch is Chief of the Customer Liaison Division, and the position of Division Chief of the Diplomatic Innovation Division is currently vacant.

Other previous eDiplomacy Directors at the U.S. Department of State include:
Joe Johnson
Gerry Gallucci
Gary Galloway (acting)
Thomas Niblock
Stephen Smith
Daniel P. Sheerin (acting)
Richard Boly
Ambassador Eric G. Nelson
Kathryn Cabral
M. Andre Goodfriend
Rahima Kandahari

Major programs

The Office of eDiplomacy runs several knowledge management and new media technology programs for the U.S. Department of State.

Among the most active are:

Diplopedia, the State Department's internal collaborative online wiki.
Communities @ State, an initiative enables State Department personnel with shared professional interests to form internal online communities to publish information, connect with others, and create discussion. 
The Virtual Student Federal Service (VSFS) program, part of a continuing effort by the State Department to harness technology, encourage a commitment to global service among young people, and to facilitate new forms of diplomatic engagement.

After developing and launching the State Department Sounding Board in 2009, Office of eDiplomacy staff supported this internal idea sharing forum, now managed by the Management Bureau and the Secretary of State's cadre.

Virtual Work Environments were initiated by the Office of eDiplomacy with Windows SharePoint Services (WSS), and used in many units at State. The State Messaging and Archive Retrieval Toolset (SMART) program leads the WSS deployment effort.

Criticism
In November 2013 Ukrainian MP Oleh Tsariov demanded a criminal investigation into the activities of TechCamp in Ukraine because he believed it was "preparations for inciting a civil war" because during training "instructors share their experience of Internet technologies, which are aimed at shaping public opinion and enhancing the protest potential and which were used to organize street protests in Libya, Egypt, Tunisia and Syria". The TechCamps program is no longer a part of the Office of eDiplomacy and is currently operated under the State Department Bureau of Educational and Cultural Affairs.

Other media mentions
Advancing U.S. Foreign Policy through eDiplomacy

See also
 Government crowdsourcing
 State Department Sounding Board
 Transformational Diplomacy
 United States Department of State
 United States Cyber-Diplomacy

References

eDIP